Yarımca or Yarymdzha or Yarymdzhan or Yarmıca may refer to:

Yarımca, Khizi, Azerbaijan
Yarımca, Nakhchivan, Azerbaijan
Yarımca, Elazığ, a town in Kovancılar district of Elazığ Province, Turkey
Yarımca, Kocaeli, merged with Tütünçiftlik to become Körfez, Kocaeli, Turkey
Yarımca, Sur
Yarımca, Uğurludağ
Yarımca, Yüreğir, a village in Adana Province, Turkey